The Azores Regional Election, 2004 was an election held on 17 October 2004 for the legislative assembly and government of the Portuguese autonomous region of the Azores, in which the Socialist Party, under the leadership of Carlos César won 57% of the votes, and got an absolute majority, for the 2nd consecutive turn. The Social Democratic Party ran in a coalition with the People's Party, called Azores Coalition, but was massively defeated gathering just 37% of the votes.

Voter turnout increased, for the first time since the 1992 election, with 55.2% of the electorate casting their ballot on election day.

Background
In the Azores, there were 52 seats in the Regional Parliament in dispute, the same of the previous election, in 2000. The seats were distributed by the 9 islands of the archipelago proportionally to the population of each island; however, each island is entitled to at least two members of parliament.

Political parties
A total of 7 parties and/or coalitions ran in these elections. The parties/coalitions listed on the voting ballots were the following:

 Left Bloc (BE);
 Earth Party (MPT);
 Democratic Party of the Atlantic (PDA);
 People's Monarchist Party (PPM);
 Socialist Party (PS), leader Carlos César;
 Social Democratic Party / People's Party (PSD/CDS–PP) Azores Coalition (CA), leader Victor do Couto Cruz
 Unitary Democratic Coalition (CDU);

Results
For a third consecutive term, the Socialist Party won the regional election in Azores, increasing its share of the vote from 49% to 57%, and re-electing Carlos César to the presidency of the Regional Government. César and his party obtained an absolute majority with 31 of the assembly's 52 seats.

The Social Democrats and the People's Party contested these elections in a joint coalition called "Azores Coalition". The coalition achieved a very disappointing result, polling 20% below the Socialists. The PSD/CDS-PP coalition only won 37% of the votes, but was able to increase the number of parliament members to 21, against the combined total of 20 both parties had since 2000. In fact, the bad result from this PSD/CDS-PP coalition was one of the reasons PSD and CDS didn't contest, in a coalition, the 2005 general elections. Due to the strong bipolarization of the race, both PS and PSD/CDS-PP gathered a total of almost 94% of the votes, and due to the application of the Hondt election model in the nine islands, the smaller parties were severely punished. The Unitary Democratic Coalition (CDU), led by the Portuguese Communist Party (PCP), saw their share of vote reduced by almost half and they lost all representation in the regional parliament. The Left Bloc also suffered a setback by polling below 1%.

The People's Monarchist Party, the Earth Party and the Democratic Party of the Atlantic also failed to make any inroads.

Summary of votes and seats

|-
! rowspan="2" colspan=2 style="background-color:#E9E9E9" align=left|Parties
! rowspan="2" style="background-color:#E9E9E9" align=right|Votes
! rowspan="2" style="background-color:#E9E9E9" align=right|%
! rowspan="2" style="background-color:#E9E9E9" align=right|±pp swing
! colspan="5" style="background-color:#E9E9E9" align="center"|MPs
! rowspan="2" style="background-color:#E9E9E9" align=right|MPs %/votes %
|- style="background-color:#E9E9E9"
! align="center"|2000
! align="center"|2004
! style="background-color:#E9E9E9" align=right|±
! style="background-color:#E9E9E9" align=right|%
! style="background-color:#E9E9E9" align=right|±
|-
| 
|60,140||56.97||7.8||30||31||1||59.62||1.9||1.05
|-
|style="width: 10px" bgcolor=#00aaaa align="center" | 
|align=left|Azores Coalition (PSD / CDS–PP)
|38,883||36.84||5.3||20||21||1||40.38||1.9||1.10
|-
| 
|2,942||2.79||2.0||2||0||2||0.00||3.9||0.0
|-
| 
|1,022||0.97||0.4||0||0||0||0.00||0||0.0
|-
| 
|369||0.35||||||0||||0.00||||0.0
|-
| 
|293||0.28||||||0||||0.00||||0.0
|-
| 
|248||0.23||||||0||||0.00||||0.0
|-
|colspan=2 align=left style="background-color:#E9E9E9"|Total valid
|width="50" align="right" style="background-color:#E9E9E9"|103,897
|width="40" align="right" style="background-color:#E9E9E9"|98.43
|width="40" align="right" style="background-color:#E9E9E9"|0.2
|width="40" align="right" style="background-color:#E9E9E9"|52
|width="40" align="right" style="background-color:#E9E9E9"|52
|width="40" align="right" style="background-color:#E9E9E9"|0
|width="40" align="right" style="background-color:#E9E9E9"|100.00
|width="40" align="right" style="background-color:#E9E9E9"|0.0
|width="40" align="right" style="background-color:#E9E9E9"|—
|-
|colspan=2|Blank ballots
|879||0.83||0.1||colspan=6 rowspan=4|
|-
|colspan=2|Invalid ballots
|780||0.74||0.1
|-
|colspan=2 align=left style="background-color:#E9E9E9"|Total
|width="50" align="right" style="background-color:#E9E9E9"|105,556
|width="40" align="right" style="background-color:#E9E9E9"|100.00
|width="40" align="right" style="background-color:#E9E9E9"|
|-
|colspan=2|Registered voters/turnout
||191,127||55.23||1.9
|-
| colspan=11 align=left | Source: Comissão Nacional de Eleições
|}

Distribution by constituency

|- class="unsortable"
!rowspan=2|Constituency!!%!!S!!%!!S
!rowspan=2|TotalS
|- class="unsortable" style="text-align:center;"
!colspan=2 | PS
!colspan=2 | CA
|-
| style="text-align:left;" | Corvo
| style="background:; color:white;"|49.4
| 1
| 36.1
| 1
| 2
|-
| style="text-align:left;" | Faial
| 39.8
| 2
| style="background:#00aaaa; color:white;"|40.2
| 2
| 4
|-
| style="text-align:left;" | Flores
| style="background:; color:white;"|46.2
| 2
| 35.9
| 1
| 3
|-
| style="text-align:left;" | Graciosa
| style="background:; color:white;"|52.7
| 2
| 44.3
| 1
| 3
|-
| style="text-align:left;" | Pico
| style="background:; color:white;"|49.4
| 2
| 46.3
| 2
| 4
|-
| style="text-align:left;" | Santa Maria
| style="background:; color:white;"|68.7
| 2
| 25.5
| 1
| 3
|-
| style="text-align:left;" | São Jorge
| 44.3
| 2
| style="background:#00aaaa; color:white;"|50.7
| 2
| 4
|-
| style="text-align:left;" | São Miguel
| style="background:; color:white;"|65.6
| 12
| 33.8
| 7
| 19
|-
| style="text-align:left;" | Terceira
| style="background:; color:white;"|59.1
| 6
| 37.0
| 4
| 10
|- class="unsortable" style="background:#E9E9E9"
| style="text-align:left;" | Total
| style="background:; color:white;"|57.0
| 31
| 36.8
| 21
| 52
|-
| colspan=6 style="text-align:left;" | Source: Comissão Nacional de Eleições
|}

References

External links
Comissão Nacional de Eleições
Legislative Assembly of Azores - Official website

See also
 2004 Madeira regional election

Azores 2004
2004 elections in Portugal